RABAC1 is a gene that in humans encodes the protein Prenylated Rab acceptor 1, also called PRA1, PRAF1, or RABAC1. It is highly conserved in eukaryotes. The protein is localized to Golgi and late endosomes, where it plays a role in vesicular trafficking, lipid transport and cell migration.

Interactions 

RABAC1 has been shown to interact with numerous prenylated members of the Rab GTPase family and VAMP2.

References

Further reading